David Alexander Segel (born April 10, 1964) is an American businessman, investor and philanthropist. Segel is a founding partner at Mako Global, Mpower Pictures and Structured Data Intelligence, creator of the Video Genome Project.

Early life and education
Segel grew up in Connecticut, Chicago and New York, graduating from Yale University in 1986 with a B.A. in Physics and Philosophy.

In 1992, Segel moved to London, England, where he lived for 16 years before returning to the US in 2008.

Career
Segel began his career in New York as an options market maker and open outcry trader.

Segel has traded as a member of the Coffee Sugar Cocoa Exchange, the Pacific Stock Exchange, the Chicago Board Options Exchange, London International Financial Futures and Options Exchange, and the Eurex Exchange.

In 1999 Segel founded a London-based derivatives trading firm Mako Global, a leader in market making of pricing and risk in stocks, bonds, commodities and financial exchange derivatives across major markets.

Segel began investing in media interests in 2007, founding Mpower Pictures with Steve McEveety, John Shepherd and Todd Matthew Burns.

Segel has served as Producer and Executive Producer on several motion pictures. Segel's most recent credits include acting as Executive Producer for Man Down (film) and The Dropbox Film (2015), as well as, Executive Producer of The Stoning of Soraya M. (2008) which won several awards including the Los Angeles Film Festival "Audience Award for Best Narrative Feature" and producer of the film Snowmen (2011).

Segel co-founded Structured Data Intelligence with Xavier Kochhar and created The Video Genome Project which “...discovers, ingests, refines and understands the component data and metadata elements of film, television, and online video records." In 2016 The Video Genome Project was acquired by Hulu.

In 2014 Segel launched Telescope Mag a digital-only magazine and website, nominated by the International Digital Magazine Awards for "Specialty Magazine of the Year".

Philanthropy

Segel founded The Promise Fund, managed through National Christian Foundation, to promote positive social values.

Segel is an advisory board member for Yale Divinity School, a Patron of We See Hope, a board member of Alpha International and board member of the Eastern Congo Initiative, an American nonprofit founded by Ben Affleck and Whitney Williams in 2010 as "the first U.S. based advocacy and grant-making initiative wholly focused on working with and for the people of eastern Congo”.

Personal life

Segel is an avid sailor and leads a racing campaign in the Nautor Swan class of sailing yachts out of Southampton, England.

A licensed pilot, Segel operates an ex-RAF Short Tucano as well as an off-field Carbon Cub SS.

Along with adventurer Alan Chambers (explorer) MBE and team, Segel trekked on skis 100 miles across the polar ice cap to reach the geographic North Pole. In 2010, he completed an expedition through the Northwest Passage, navigating from East to West in an open Rigid Inflatable Boat (RIB) with adventurer Bear Grylls and traveling 2500 km from Baffin Island to the Beaufort Sea. Footage from the expedition aired on CNN September 2010.

References

External links

 SGL official website
 Mako Global official website
 SDI
 Telescope Magazine official website
 Hope HIV official website
 Mpower Pictures official website
 Alpha USA official website
 Alpha International official website
 Trinity Exploration Board of Directors

1964 births
American film producers
American philanthropists
Living people